Rockabye may refer to:
Rockabye (1932 film), starring Constance Bennett and Joel McCrea
Rockabye (1986 film), starring Jimmy Smits and Valerie Bertinelli
"Rockabye" (song), a 2016 song by Clean Bandit featuring Sean Paul and Anne-Marie
Rockabye (album), a 1992 album by Robin Holcomb, or the title track
"Rockabye" (Law & Order: Special Victims Unit), a 2005 episode of Law & Order: Special Victims Unit

See also
"Rock-A-Bye", a 2005 song by Black Buddafly
Rockaby, a 1980 play by Samuel Beckett
Rock-a-bye Baby (disambiguation)
"Lullaby" (Shawn Mullins song), commonly incorrectly referred to as "Rockabye"
"The Rockabye", a 1993 song by Revolting Cocks